Thiago Gomes may refer to:

 Thiago Gomes (rower) (born 1979), Brazilian rower
 Thiago Gomes (footballer) (born 1982), Brazilian footballer
 Thiago Gomes (football manager) (born 1984), Brazilian football manager

See also
 Tiago Gomes (disambiguation)